Nowawieś Chełmińska  is a village in the administrative district of Gmina Chełmno, within Chełmno County, Kuyavian-Pomeranian Voivodeship, in north-central Poland. It is located in the Chełmno Land in the historic region of Pomerania.

The village has a population of 180.

History
During the German occupation (World War II), in 1939, local Polish teachers and farmers were murdered by the Germans in a massacre of Poles committed in nearby Klamry as part of the Intelligenzaktion.

References

Villages in Chełmno County